This is a list of the works of the Austrian, later American, composer Ernst Krenek (1900–1991).

Operas

See List of operas by Ernst Krenek.

Ballets
 Mammon, Op. 37 (1925)
 Der vertauschte Cupido, Op. 38 (1925)
 Eight Column Line, Op. 85 (1939)

Vocal music
Choral
 Drei Gemischte Chöre (Matthias Claudius), Op. 22, for mixed choir a capella (1923)
 Die Jahreszeiten (Hölderlin), Op. 35 (1925)
 Kantate von der Vergänglichkeit des Irdischen, Op. 72 (1932)
 Two Choruses on Jacobean Poems, Op. 87 (1939)
 Lamentatio Jeremiae prophetae, Op. 93 (1941–2)
 5 Prayers (John Donne), Op. 97 (1944)
 Santa Fe Timetable, Op. 102 (1945)
 Missa duodecim tonorum, Op. 165, mixed choir and organ (1957–8)
 Sechs Motetten nach Worten von Franz Kafka, Op. 169, for mixed choir a cappella (1959), texts by Franz Kafka
 O Holy Ghost, Op. 186A (1964)
 Three Madrigals, SSA a cappella (1960)

Solo vocal
With piano unless otherwise indicated:
 Lieder, Op. 19 on texts by Otfried Krzyzanowski and Friedrich Gottlieb Klopstock
 O Lacrymosa, Op. 48 (1926); text written for Krenek by Rilke, also orch. ver., Op. 48a
 Monolog der Stella, Op. 57 (1928) on texts by Goethe
 Reisebuch aus den österreichischen Alpen (text by the composer), Op. 62 (1929)
 Die Nachtigall, Op. 68 (1931); text by Karl Kraus from "Worte in Versen"
 The Ballad of the Railroads, Op. 78 (1944, text by the composer)
 Fünf Lieder, Op. 82 (1937/38); texts by Franz Kafka
 Vier Lieder, Op. 112 (1946/47); texts by Gerard Manley Hopkins
 Medea, Op. 129, mezzo soprano and orchestra (1951, text: German translation of Robinson Jeffers' adaptation in English of Medea by Euripides)
 Sestina (text by the composer), Op.161, soprano and 8 instruments (1957)
 Der Floh, Op. 175 (1960); text by John Donne
 Wechselrahmen, Op. 189 (1964/65); texts by Emil Barth (1900-1958)

Orchestral
Symphonies
 Symphony No. 1, Op. 7 (1921)
 Symphony No. 2, Op. 12 (1922)
 Symphony No. 3, Op. 16 (1922)
 Concerto Grosso, Op. 25 (1924)
 Concertino for Flute, Violin, Piano, and String Orchestra, Op. 27 (1924)
 Symphony for winds and percussion, Op. 34 (1924–25)
 Little Symphony, Op. 58 (1928)
 Symphony No. 4, Op. 113 (1947)
 Symphony No. 5, Op. 119 (1949)
 Symphony "Pallas Athene", Op. 137 (1954)
 Horizon Circled, Op.196 (1967)

Concertos and concertante works
 Violin
 Violin concerto No. 1, Op. 29 (1924)
 Violin concerto No. 2, Op. 140 (1954)
 Cello
 Cello concerto No. 1, Op. 133 (1953)
 Capriccio for cello and orchestra, Op. 145 (1955)
 Cello concerto No. 2, Op. 236 (1982)
 Piano
 Piano Concerto No. 1 in F-sharp major, Op. 18 (1923)
 Piano Concerto No. 2, Op. 81 (1937)
 Piano Concerto No. 3, Op. 107 (1946)
 Piano Concerto No. 4, Op. 123 (1950)
 Harp
 Concerto for harp and chamber orchestra, Op. 126 (1951)
 Organ
 Organ Concerto (Concerto for Organ and Strings), Op. 230 (1979)
 Organ Concerto, Op. 235 (1982)
 Other
 Seven Orchestra Pieces, Op. 31 (1924)
 Potpourri, Op. 54 (1927)
 Little Concerto for piano or harpsichord, organ, and chamber orchestra, Op. 88 (1940)
 Tricks and Trifles, Op. 101 (1945)
 Double Concerto for violin, piano and small orchestra, Op. 124 (1950)

Serial Music
 Static and Ecstatic, Op.214 (1972)

Wind band
Marches
Three Merry Marches (1924–26)

Chamber works
Monologue for clarinet solo (1956)
Serenade for clarinet and string trio, Op. 4 (1919)
"Four Pieces" for oboe and piano (1966) 
Five Pieces for trombone and piano (1967)
Flute players serenade: rondo for four flutes (as Thornton Winsloe)
Sonata for viola solo, Op. 92 No. 3 (1942)
Sonata for viola and piano, Op. 117 (1948)
Sonata No. 1 for violin solo, Op. 33 (1925)
Sonata No. 2 for violin solo, Op. 115 (1948)
Sonata No. 1 in F-sharp minor for violin and piano, Op. 3 (1919)
Sonata No. 2 for violin and piano, Op. 99 (1945)
Sonatine for Bb bass clarinet and piano (as Thornton Winsloe)
String quartet No. 1, Op. 6 (1921)
String quartet No. 2, Op. 8 (1921)
String quartet No. 3, Op. 20 (1923)
String quartet No. 4, Op. 24 (1924)
String quartet No. 5, Op. 65 (1930)
String quartet No. 6, Op. 78 (1936)
String quartet No. 7, Op. 96 (1944)
String quartet No. 8, Op. 233 (1980)
String trio, Op. 108 (1946)
String trio Parvula Corona Musicalis: ad honorem Johannis Sebastiani Bach, Op. 122 (1950)
String trio in 12 Stations, Op. 237 (1985)
Suite for cello solo, Op. 84 (1939)
Suite for guitar, Op. 164 (1957)
Flute Piece, in nine phases for flute and piano, Op.171 (1959)

Piano
Double fugue in C major, Op. 1a
Tanzstudie, Op. 1b
Sonata No. 1, Op. 2 in E-flat (1919)
Sonatina, Op. 5, No. 1
Little Suite, Op. 13a
Five Piano Pieces, Op. 39
Sonata No. 2, Op. 59
Twelve Variations in 3 Movements, Op. 79
Twelve Short Pieces Written in the Twelve-Tone Technique, Op. 83
Sonata No. 3, Op. 92, No. 4 *
Eight Pieces, Op. 110
Sonata No. 4, Op. 114
George Washington Variations, Op. 120
Sonata No. 5, Op. 121
Sonata No. 6, Op. 128
Miniature (Largo), Op. 136
Twenty Miniatures, Op. 139
Echoes from Austria, Op. 166
Six Measurements, Op. 168
Piano Piece in 11 Parts, Op. 197
Sonata No. 7, Op. 240
Prelude, WoO 87

Electronic music
 Spiritus Intelligentiae, Sanctus, Op. 152, two solo voices and tape (1956)
 San Fernando Sequence, Op. 185 (1963)
 Exercises of a Late Hour, Op. 200 (1967)
 Orga-Nastro, Op. 212, organ and tape (1971), commissioned by and dedicated to Marilyn Mason.
 They Knew What They Wanted, Op. 227, narrator, oboe, piano, percussion and tape (1977)

*The rest of, Op. 92 contains works for other instrumental combinations, including solo viola and solo organ.

References

 Bowles, Garrett H. (comp.) (1989). Ernst Krenek: A Bio-bibliography. New York and London: Greenwood Press. 
 Bowles, Garrett H. (2001). "Krenek, Ernst". The New Grove Dictionary of Music and Musicians, edited by Stanley Sadie and John Tyrrell. London: Macmillan.

 
Krenek